The 1955 Australian Championships was a tennis tournament that took place on outdoor Grass courts at the Memorial Drive, Adelaide, Australia from 21 January to 31 January. 

It was the 43rd edition of the Australian Championships (now known as the Australian Open), the 11th held in Adelaide, and the first Grand Slam tournament of the year. The singles titles were won by Australians Ken Rosewall and Beryl Penrose.

Champions

Men's singles

 Ken Rosewall defeated  Lew Hoad  9–7, 6–4, 6–4

Women's singles

 Beryl Penrose defeated  Thelma Coyne Long  6–4, 6–3

Men's doubles
 Vic Seixas /  Tony Trabert defeated  Lew Hoad /  Ken Rosewall 6–3, 6–2, 2–6, 3–6, 6–1

Women's doubles
 Mary Bevis Hawton /  Beryl Penrose defeated  Nell Hall Hopman /  Gwen Thiele 7–5, 6–1

Mixed doubles
 Thelma Coyne Long /  George Worthington defeated  Jenny Staley /  Lew Hoad 6–2, 6–1

References

External links
 Australian Open official website

1955
1955 in Australian tennis
January 1955 sports events in Australia